Motu Tupe is a  private island in the lagoon of Bora Bora in French Polynesia.
It is the located between Tape and Taufarii.

History
Motu Tupe is well known in Bora Bora as being the location of the Bora Bora Lagoonarium.

Administration
The island is part of Bora Bora Commune.

Tourism
The Lagoonarium is operated by the Le Meridien resort.
On the island there is a pension

Transportation

After arriving in Fa'a'ā International Airport, an Air Tahiti inter-island flight (50 minutes) will bring you to Bora Bora Airport.

There, you will need to hire a boat at the Rent-a-boat Office.

References

External links

 
French Polynesian culture
Geography of French Polynesia
History of French Polynesia
Private islands of French Polynesia